Kut may refer to:

People 
 Kut (surname)
 Karel Kuttelwascher (Kut; 1916-1959), Czech RAF fighter pilot

Places
 Kut, a city in eastern Iraq
 Kut Barrage, a barrage (dam) on the Tigris River
 Kut District, Iraq
 Kut, Armenia, town in Gegharkunik Province
 Kut, Abadan, a village in Khuzestan Province, Iran
 Kut, Hendijan, a village in Khuzestan Province, Iran
 Kut, a village in Lukovytsia, Chernivtsi Raion, Chernivtsi Oblast, Ukraine

War
 Siege of Kut, a WWI battle for the Mesopotamian city
 Second Battle of Kut, WWI

Other uses 
 KUT 90.5 FM, a public radio station of the University of Texas at Austin
 KUT (Kenya Uganda Tanganyika), postage stamps and postal history of Kenya, Uganda, Tanganyika during British colonial era
 Kut, ISO 639-2 and 639-3 codes for the Kutenai language, a Native American/First Nations language
 Kut or Gut (ritual), by a Korean shaman
 Hungarian title of 2016 film Well
 Kut (mythology), in Turkic mythology a mystic force
 Kut (spider), a genus of woodlouse hunting spiders

See also
 All Wikipedia pages beginning with Kut-e (a common element in Iranian place names)